The Macedonian national handball team is the national handball team of North Macedonia. The team is run by the Macedonian Handball Federation, the governing body of handball in North Macedonia. Prior to joining the International Handball Federation in 1991 as an independent country, North Macedonia was represented within the Yugoslavia men's national handball team.

History

First Handball teams in Macedonia emerged in the second half of the 1940s. Soon Macedonian Handball federation started to organize national championships in big handball −11 players on a soccer field size. By the '60s it was transformed into small handball or indoor handball. Macedonian champions were qualified for federal Yugoslav Championship instead of European cup competitions. The best Macedonian players played for the Federal team of Yugoslavia. In the time of the federation, 6 of the constitutional republics were sending one federal team to compete at the Olympics and World cup. Macedonia was participating within the federal team from 1950 till 1991. After the split of the federation, as a single republic from 1992 till 1994 Macedonia did not manage to enter the qualifications for EC, WC and OG. From 1995 Macedonia participates as a single Republic to all qualifications and Championship tournaments.

During the period 1958 till 1991 Macedonia was within the Federation of SFRJ. It was represented internationally within the team Yugoslavia as part of the Federation of 6 Republics. Macedonia is not a successor of the results of team Yugoslavia it was just part of it. During that time was present at the 5 Olympics and 10 World cup tournaments within the successful team Yugoslavia. After the split Macedonian team started to compete representing the single independent Republic. At the 1992 Olympics Yugoslavia team was banned to participate. At the World cup 1993 only teams from the Olympics qualified so the Macedonian team did not have a chance to qualify. For the first European Championship 1994 team Macedonia did not enter the qualifications. For the World cup 1995 only teams from EURO 1994 qualified so again team Macedonian did not get a chance to participate. Since EURO 1996 team Macedonia is regular in the qualifications. It entered 6 European Championships first one in 1998 then 2012, 2014, 2016, 2018 and 2020. Most successful was the 2012 when they've finished 5th. For the  World Cup's they entered 7 times – 1999, 2009, 2013, 2015, 2017, 2019 and 2021. The most successful was in 2015 when they finished 9th. For the Olympic tournament qualifications they have entered two times – 2012 finishing 4th and 2016 finishing 3rd .They did not manage to finish in the first two spots and have not qualified.

Home ground

The BTSC – Boris Trajkovski Sports Center ,  Skopje is a multi-functional indoor sports arena. It is located in the Karpoš Municipality of Skopje, Macedonia. It is named after the former president, Boris Trajkovski. Its capacity is 10,000 .There is an Olympic size Swimming Pool and 5 Star Hotel Alexander Palace within the complex. Additional Water Land Fun Park and Ice Skating Rink next to it. 

The arena is a home ground of the  Macedonian handball team (men and women). The venue also contains four restaurants and a sports bar. It was one of two venues for the 2008 European Women's Handball Championship and will be used again for the 2022 European Women's Handball Championship for the preliminary and main round.

Colors
National kit colors are colors of the flag which are also spread on the presidential shield. Noble blood red and golden yellow sun devine "ILI".

Competitive record

Olympic Games

World Championship

European Championship

Mediterranean Games

Macedonian fans
Macedonia has great support at their matches from their fans. There is always a great number of fans following the national team on every World Cup or EURO championship they attend.  Cheerful friendly fans create a great atmosphere at every game.

Team

Current squad
Squad for the 2023 World Men's Handball Championship.

Head coach: Kiril Lazarov

Notable players

Mitko Stoilov
Stole Stoilov
Goran Kuzmanoski
Branislav Angelovski
Stevče Aluševski
Vlatko Mitkov
Aco Jonovski
Filip Mirkulovski
Velko Markoski
Zlatko Mojsoski
Borko Ristovski
Aleksandar Jović
Naumče Mojsovski
Vančo Dimovski
Petar Angelov
Filip Lazarov
Zlatko Daskalovski
Goce Makaloski
Goran Gjorgonoski
Radoslav Stojanović
Kiril Lazarov
Vlado Nedanovski
Lazo Majnov
Pepi Manaskov
Vladimir Temelkov
Nemanja Pribak
Renato Vugrinec

Statistics

Most appearances

Top scorers

Record against other teams
As of 3 May 2021

References

External links

IHF profile

Men's national handball teams
Handball in North Macedonia
Handball
Articles containing video clips